Vibrio casei is a Gram-negative species of bacterium in the genus Vibrio. Strains of this species were originally isolated from portions of French soft cheese. Genetically similar species and strains have been found in American cheesemaking plants.

References

External links
Type strain of Vibrio casei at BacDive -  the Bacterial Diversity Metadatabase

Vibrionales
Bacteria described in 2009